Gerrit Angelo Forbes (30 May 1836 - 22 September 1906) was a justice of the Supreme Court of New York beginning in 1888. He served as District Attorney for Madison County from January 1871 to December 1874. He was a member of the Madison County and State Bar Associations. Forbes was serving his second term on the Supreme Court at the time of his death.

References

New York Supreme Court Justices
1836 births
1906 deaths
19th-century American judges